Eugene Glass School is an art school located in Eugene, Oregon featuring glass art workshops for off-hand, lampworked, and fused glass.

External links
Eugene Glass School

Art schools in Oregon
Glassmaking schools
Education in Eugene, Oregon